The Sa'ad ad-Din Islands, also Romanized as  and known as the Zeila Archipelago, are a group of islands off the northern coast of Somaliland. They are situated near the ancient city of Zeila.

The Zeila Archipelago is made of six small islands all of which are low-lying and have sandy beaches. The largest of these islands are Sacadin and Aibat, which are six and nine miles off the coast of Zeila, respectively. There is also a lighthouse at Aibat.

Etymology & History

The name for the archipelago comes from the Sultan Sa'ad ad-Din II who was killed by the Emperor of Abyssinia on the main island in 1415. The archpeligo is also known as the Zeila Archipelago and the Sa'ad ad-Din group.

Legendary Arab explorer Ahmad ibn Mājid wrote of the archipelago and a few other notable landmarks and ports of the northern Somali coast, including Zeila, Berbera, Xiis, Alula, Ruguuda, Maydh, Ceel-Sheekh, Siyara and El-Darad.

The archipelago is the site where the remaining forces of Sheikh Bashir were shipped to after the conclusion of the 1945 Sheikh Bashir Rebellion.

Environment

The Sa'ad ad-Din Islands are well known for their splendid coral reefs similar to those found on the southern coast of Oman. These reefs are the most diverse and well formed coral reefs on the coast of the Gulf of Aden and possibly the largest in the region. From provincial counts, ninety-nine different species of coral from forty-three different genera have been found on the islands.

There are also a hundred and thirty-two different species of coral fish found around the archipelago. Many of these species include those also found in the Red Sea, Gulf of Aden, and the Indian Ocean.

The island of Sa'ad ad-Din and Aibat (called Ceebaad in Somali) both are sites of major bird colonies. On the island of Sa'ad ad-Din alone, there were more than 100,000 breeding pairs recorded.

Following the 2004 Indian Ocean earthquake and tsunami, the International Union for Conservation of Nature (IUCN) and other NGO worked with local authorizes to establish protected areas and monitor fishers on the islands.

Demographics
The island has no inhabitants but is a place where tourists come It is close to the area where Mohamed Case lives and those who wish to honor Sa'ad ad-Din II.

See also
 Ifat Sultanate
 Sa'ad ad-Din II
 Zeila
 List of islands in the Indian Ocean
 Bajuni Islands

Citations

Sources

Archipelagoes of Somaliland
Islands of Somalia
Islands of Somaliland